Göller is a village in the Çayırlı District, Erzincan Province, Turkey. The village had a population of 30 in 2021.

The hamlets of Aktaş and Deliktaş are attached to the village.

References 

Villages in Çayırlı District